BT Redcare is the largest supplier of alarm signalling services for security and fire in the UK. It was established over thirty years ago, and works with both the business and domestic markets.

Redcare is a widely deployed service from BT, used in the UK. Redcare signalling is fitted by alarm installation companies (“installers”), then provides a signal from a customer’s premises to an alarm receiving centre (ARC).

ARCs monitor the signal 24 hours a day and, when necessary, alert the customer, nominated persons, police and fire services.

The BT Redcare Network has 99.997% reliability and is a dedicated network developed for security alarm and fire alarm signalling. It is supported by BT technology.

The system transmits a continuous signal on a standard telephone line, which can also be used for voice and broadband services, to prevent alarm systems being defeated by the line being cut.

Redcare works below the voice frequency spectrum on a phone line in order to avoid interference with calls or broadband, which uses frequencies above the voice spectrum.

Other versions also use GSM (mobile) as a backup to the main phone line or can function using either wireless (2G/3G mobile data) or IP as the primary connection all backed up by an alternative signalling path. These 2G/3G and IP offerings are marketed by Redcare under their Secure product range.

BT Redcare fire and security product have insurer-endorsed LPS 1277 third-party certification.

The company’s products include:

 Security
 Redcare Classic
 Redcare GSM Roaming
 Redcare Secure IP
 Redcare Secure 3
 Redcare Secure 2
 Redcare Secure Solo
 Fire
 Redcare Secure Fire IP
 Redcare Secure Fire
 Redcare Classic Fire

References

External links 
 National Security Inspectorate: ARC Gold approval criteria. http://www.nsi.org.uk/wp-content/uploads/2012/10/SF006-1-ARC-Criteria.pdf. Retrieved 13 November 2017
 What is Redcare? http://www.redcare.bt.com/what/ Retrieved 23 December 2017

Telecommunications standards
Security technology
BT Group